Millococha (possibly from Quechua millu salty / aluminum sulfate used to dye something, qucha lake,) is a lake in Peru located in the Huancavelica Region, Huancavelica Province, Acobambilla District. Millococha lies west of the large lake named Huarmicocha. Near the lake there is also a village named Millococha.

See also
List of lakes in Peru

References

Lakes of Peru
Lakes of Huancavelica Region